Roadmarks is a science fantasy novel by American author Roger Zelazny, written during the late 1970s and published in 1979.

Structure and characters
The novel postulates a road that travels through time, with a nexus placed every few years where a handful of specially gifted people are able to get on and off. The plot involves a series of assassination attempts on the protagonist, with short vignettes on each of the would-be assassins.

The book has two poetry collections as characters. Les Fleurs du Mal by Charles Baudelaire and Leaves of Grass by Walt Whitman appear as cybernetic extensions of themselves. They are companions of the protagonist and his son Randy, and referred to as "Flowers" and "Leaves" respectively. They talk, argue and frequently quote their own content, exhibiting human-like levels of intelligence.

The novel alternates between non-linear "Two" and linear "One" chapters. According to Zelazny:

I did not decide until I was well into the book that since there was really two time-situations being dealt with (on-Road and off-Road—with off-Road being anywhen in history), I needed only two chapter headings, One and Two, to let the reader know where we are. And since the Twos were non-linear, anyway, I clipped each Two chapter into a discrete packet, stacked them and then shuffled them before reinserting them between the Ones. It shouldn't have made any difference, though I wouldn't have had the guts to try doing that without my experience with my other experimental books and the faith it had given me in the feelings I'd developed toward narrative."

The book's editor was confused by the "Two" chapters and required Zelazny to rearrange the order of a few of them before publication.

Plot summary
The central theme of the novel is time travel using a highway that links all times and all possible histories. Exits from the highway lead to different times and places. Changing events in the past cause some exits further up the road, in the future, to become overgrown and inaccessible and new exits to appear, leading to different alternative futures.

The narrator and protagonist, Red Dorakeen, has vague memories of a place or time that is no longer accessible from the Road. He runs guns to the Greeks at Marathon, trying to recreate history as he remembers it in an attempt to open a new exit from the Road to his half-remembered place. The phrase "Last Exit to Babylon" was the manuscript title of the book and appears on the cover art; it was later used as a title for Volume Four in the Collected Stories of Roger Zelazny.

All "One" chapters feature Red Dorakeen, and all "Two" chapters feature secondary characters. These are Red's natural son Randy, newly introduced to the Road and tired of his old life in Ohio; a series of potential assassins attempting to kill Red, some of whom are comic references to pulp characters or real people; and Leila, a woman whose destiny is closely connected to Red's.

The "One" storyline is fairly linear, but the "Two" storyline jumps around in time and sequence, first introducing Randy and Leila without introduction, then later showing Randy's introduction to the Road and meeting with Leila, who will/has just abandoned Red following an incident in the "One" timeline. The narrative becomes clear in the final chapter.

Reception
Greg Costikyan reviewed Roadmarks in Ares Magazine #5, commenting that "Roadmarks is a fun book – and, from anyone but Zelazny, it would be considered a tour de force. Its major difficulty would seem to be that Zelazny tried to force too many ideas into a length unsuited for them, thus being unable to exploit all of those ideas to satisfying fullness."

Reviews
Review by Baird Searles (1980) in Isaac Asimov's Science Fiction Magazine, January 1980
Review by Stephen P. Brown [as by Steve Brown] (1980) in Heavy Metal, February 1980
Review by Tom Staicar (1980) in Amazing Stories, May 1980
Review by Darrell Schweitzer (1980) in Science Fiction Review, May 1980
Review by Orson Scott Card (1980) in Destinies, Spring 1980
Review by Spider Robinson (1980) in Analog Science Fiction/Science Fact, May 1980
Review by Tom Hosty (1980) in Foundation, #20 October 1980
Review by uncredited (1981) in Ad Astra, Issue Sixteen
Review by Martyn Taylor (1981) in Vector 105
Review by W. Ritchie Benedict (1981) in Thrust, #17, Summer 1981

Adaptation
In February 2021, it was reported that George R.R. Martin and Kalinda Vazquez are developing a TV adaptation of the novel for HBO.

References

1979 American novels
1979 science fiction novels
Novels by Roger Zelazny
American science fiction novels
Novels about time travel
Les Fleurs du mal in popular culture
Nonlinear narrative novels
Del Rey books